Oksana Balkanovna Potdykova (born 20 January 1979) is a Russian ice dancing coach and former competitor. Competing with Denis Petukhov, she became a two-time World Junior medalist (silver in 1997, bronze in 1998) and the 2000 Russian national bronze medalist.

Skating career

Early years 
Potdykova and Denis Petukhov began appearing together in international junior competitions in the 1994–1995 season. In November 1996, they won silver at the 1997 World Junior Championships in Seoul, South Korea, finishing second to their compatriots Nina Ulanova / Mikhail Stifounin.

1997–1998 season 
Competing in October on the 1997–1998 ISU Junior Series, Potdykova/Petukhov won gold in Chemnitz, Germany, and then bronze in Székesfehérvár, Hungary. In December, they received the bronze medal at the 1998 World Junior Championships in Saint John, New Brunswick, Canada; they were third behind Jessica Joseph / Charles Butler of the United States and Federica Faiella / Luciano Milo of Italy. In March, they won silver, finishing second to Faiella/Milo, at the ISU Junior Series Final in Lausanne, Switzerland.

1998–1999 season 
Potdykova/Petukhov began appearing on the senior level. They took silver at the 1998 Finlandia Trophy and bronze at the 1998 Golden Spin of Zagreb. They placed fifth at the 1998 Skate Israel and seventh at the 1999 Russian Championships.

1999–2000 season 
Potdykova/Petukhov received the bronze medal at the 1999 Finlandia Trophy and finished seventh at their Grand Prix event, the 1999 Cup of Russia. After winning bronze at the 2000 Russian Championships, they were sent to the 2000 European Championships in Vienna, where they placed 12th. The two were coached by Elena Chaikovskaya and Tatiana Kuzmina in Moscow. In the spring of 2000, Potdykova retired from competition due to an injury.

Post-competitive career 
Potdykova became a skating coach and choreographer, based in Sofia, Bulgaria. Her former students include Ina Demireva / Juri Kurakin.

Competitive highlights
GP: Grand Prix; JGP: Junior Series (Junior Grand Prix)

 with Petukhov

References

External links

 IceDance.com profile

Figure skaters from Moscow
Figure skaters from Sofia
Russian emigrants to Bulgaria
Russian female ice dancers
Russian figure skating coaches
Living people
1979 births
World Junior Figure Skating Championships medalists
Competitors at the 1999 Winter Universiade